Gerald Wilson was an American jazz trumpeter, big band bandleader, composer, arranger, and educator.

Gerald Wilson may also refer to:
 Gerald Wilson (writer), Canadian writer
 Gerald Wilson (cricketer), English cricketer
 Gerald H. Wilson, American Old Testament scholar
 Jerry Wilson (sailor) (Gerald Wilson), Canadian sailor